Meat Cake is a comic book series written and drawn by Dame Darcy. Originally published by Caliber Press, Meat Cake was published by Fantagraphics in the United States from 1993 to 2008. 

Meat Cake has been described as "neo-Victorian," with each issue containing a collection of stories featuring a cast of oddball characters. All the same, Meat Cake was characterized by one critic as extremely personal: "the aesthetic that made Meatcake so distinctive wasn't cultivated; it was who [Dame Darcy] was, and how she was."

Publication history 
One issue of Meat Cake was published in 1992 by Caliber Press. 

In 1993 Fantagraphics picked up Meat Cake as an ongoing series, starting over the numbering with issue #1. Early issues were produced approximately every 6 months, but by issue #8, only one issue was published per year, until issue #17 (2008). No new issues of Meat Cake have appeared since.

Collected editions 
 Dame Darcy's Meat Cake Compilation (Fantagraphics, 2003; reprint edition, 2010) — collects material from the first decade of the comic; includes "Hungry is the Heart," a collaboration between Dame Darcy and Alan Moore
 The Meat Cake Bible (Fantagraphics, 2016)  — every story from all 17 issues (1993-2008), as well as new stories from the unpublished 18th issue

Recurring characters 
 Effluvia the Mermaid
 Wax Wolf — a roguish roué
 Igpay the Pig Latin pig
 Stregapez — a woman who speaks by dispensing Pez-like tablets through a bloody hole in her throat
 Hindrance and Perfidia — mischievous Siamese twins
 Scampi the Selfish Shellfish
 Friend the Girl
 Richard Dirt — a blond bombshell

References 

1993 comics debuts
Caliber Comics titles
Fantagraphics titles